The 1973 Chilean coup d'état was a military coup in Chile that deposed the Popular Unity government of President Salvador Allende. Allende had been the first Marxist to be elected president of a liberal democracy in Latin America. On 11 September 1973, after an extended period of social unrest and political tension between the opposition-controlled Congress and the socialist President, as well as economic war ordered by United States President Richard Nixon, a group of military officers led by General Augusto Pinochet seized power in a coup of their own, ending civilian rule.

The military established a junta that suspended all political activity in Chile and repressed left-wing movements, especially communist and socialist parties and the Revolutionary Left Movement (MIR). Pinochet rose to supreme power within a year of the coup and was formally declared President of Chile in late 1974. The Nixon administration, which had worked to create the conditions for the coup, promptly recognized the junta government and supported it in consolidating power.

During the air raids and ground attacks that preceded the coup, Allende gave his final speech, vowing to stay in the presidential palace and refusing offers of safe passage should he choose exile over confrontation. Salvador Allende died in the palace,  but the precise circumstances of his death are still contested.

Before the coup, Chile had been hailed as a beacon of democracy and political stability for decades, a period in which the rest of South America had been plagued by military juntas and caudillismo. The collapse of Chilean democracy ended a succession of democratic governments in Chile, which had held democratic elections since 1932. Historian Peter Winn characterised the 1973 coup as one of the most violent events in the history of Chile. The coup marked the beginning of a violent, enduring campaign of political suppression via torture, murder and exile, rendering leftist opposition to the Pinochet regime weak within Chile. An internationally supported plebiscite in 1988 held under the military junta was followed by a peaceful transition to a democratic civilian government.

Due to occurring on the same date as the September 11, 2001, attacks in the United States, the coup has often been referred to as "the other 9/11".

Political background

Allende contested the 1970 presidential election with Jorge Alessandri Rodriguez of the National Party and Radomiro Tomic of the Christian Democratic Party. Allende received 36.6% of the vote. Alessandri was a very close second with 35.3%, and Tomic third with 28.1%. Although Allende received the highest number of votes, according to the Chilean constitution and since none of the candidates won by an absolute majority, the National Congress had to decide among the candidates.

The 1925 constitution did not allow a person to be president for consecutive terms. The incumbent president, Eduardo Frei Montalva, was therefore ineligible as a candidate. The CIA's "Track I" operation was a plan to influence the Congress to choose Alessandri, who would resign after a short time in office, forcing a second election. Frei would then be eligible to run. Alessandri announced on 9 September that if Congress chose him, he would resign. Allende signed a Statute of Constitutional Guarantees, which stated that he would follow the constitution during his presidency trying to shore up support for his candidacy. Congress then decided on Allende.

The U.S. feared the example of a "well-functioning socialist experiment" in the region and exerted diplomatic, economic, and covert pressure upon Chile's elected socialist government. At the end of 1971, the Cuban Prime Minister Fidel Castro made a four-week state visit to Chile, alarming American observers worried about the "Chilean Way to Socialism".

In 1972, Economics Minister Pedro Vuskovic adopted monetary policies that increased the amount of circulating currency and devalued the escudo, which increased inflation to 140 percent in 1972 and engendered a black market economy.

In October 1972, Chile suffered the first of many strikes. Among the participants were small-scale businessmen, some professional unions, and student groups. Its leaders – Vilarín, Jaime Guzmán, Rafael Cumsille, Guillermo Elton, Eduardo Arriagada – expected to depose the elected government. Other than damaging the national economy, the principal effect of the 24-day strike was drawing Army head, General Carlos Prats, into the government as Interior Minister, an appeasement to the right wing., replacing General René Schneider, who had been assassinated (Schneider had been shot on 22 October 1970 by a group led by General Roberto Viaux, whom the Central Intelligence Agency had not attempted to discourage, and died three days later.) General Prats supported the legalist Schneider Doctrine and refused military involvement in a coup d'état against President Allende.

Despite the declining economy, President Allende's Popular Unity coalition increased its vote to 43.2% in the March 1973 parliamentary elections; but, by then, the informal alliance between Popular Unity and the Christian Democrats ended. The Christian Democrats allied with the right-wing National Party, who were opposed to Allende's government; the two right-wing parties formed the Confederation of Democracy (CODE). The internecine parliamentary conflict between the legislature and the executive branch paralyzed the activities of government.

Allende began to fear his opponents, convinced they were plotting his assassination. Using his daughter as a messenger, he explained the situation to Fidel Castro. Castro gave four pieces of advice: convince technicians to stay in Chile, sell only copper for US dollars, do not engage in extreme revolutionary acts which would give opponents an excuse to wreck or seize control of the economy, and maintain a proper relationship with the Chilean military until local militias could be established and consolidated. Allende attempted to follow Castro's advice, but the latter two recommendations proved difficult.

The military prior to the coup
Prior to the coup, the Chilean military had undergone a process of de-politicization since the 1920s, when military personnel participated in government positions. Subsequently, most military officers remained under-funded, having only subsistence salaries. Because of the low salaries, the military spent much time in military leisure-time facilities (e.g. country clubs) where they met other officers and their families. The military remained apart from society, and was to some degree an endogamous group as officers frequently married the sisters of their comrades or the daughters of high-ranked older officers. Many officers also had relatives in the military. In 1969 elements of the military made their first act of rebellion in 40 years when they participated in the Tacnazo insurrection. The Tacnazo was not a proper coup, but a protest against under-funding. In retrospect General Carlos Prats considered that Christian Democrats who were in power in 1969 committed the error of not taking the military's grievances seriously.

Throughout the 1960s, the governments of Brazil (1964), Argentina (1966), Peru (1968), and Bolivia (1969) were overthrown in US-backed coups and replaced by military governments. In June 1973 Uruguay joined the coup d'état wave that swept through the region. The poor conditions of the Chilean military contrasted with the change of fortune the military of neighboring countries experienced as they came to power in coups.

During the decades prior to the coup, the military became influenced by the United States' anti-communist ideology in the context of various cooperation programs, including the U.S. Army School of the Americas.

Crisis

On 29 June 1973, Colonel Roberto Souper surrounded the La Moneda presidential palace with his tank regiment and failed to depose the Allende Government. That failed coup d'état – known as the Tanquetazo tank putsch – had been organized by the nationalist "Fatherland and Liberty" paramilitary group.

In August 1973, a constitutional crisis occurred; the Supreme Court publicly complained about the government's inability to enforce the law of the land. On 22 August, the Chamber of Deputies (with the Christian Democrats united with the National Party) accused the government of unconstitutional acts and called upon the military to enforce constitutional order.

For months, the government had feared calling upon the Carabineros national police, suspecting them of disloyalty. On 9 August, Allende appointed General Carlos Prats as Minister of Defense. He was forced to resign both as defense minister and as the Army commander-in-chief on 24 August 1973, embarrassed by the Alejandrina Cox incident and a public protest of the wives of his generals at his house. General Augusto Pinochet replaced him as Army commander-in-chief the same day. In late August 1973, 100,000 Chilean women congregated at Plaza de la Constitución to protest against the government for the rising cost and increasing shortages of food and fuels, but they were dispersed with tear gas.

Chamber of Deputies' resolution
On 23 August 1973, with the support of the Christian Democrats and National Party members, the Chamber of Deputies passed 81–47 a resolution that asked "the President of the Republic, Ministers of State, and members of the Armed and Police Forces" to "put an immediate end" to "breach[es of] the Constitution . . . with the goal of redirecting government activity toward the path of Law and ensuring the Constitutional order of our Nation, and the essential underpinnings of democratic co-existence among Chileans."

The resolution declared that the Allende Government sought ". . . to conquer absolute power with the obvious purpose of subjecting all citizens to the strictest political and economic control by the State . . . [with] the goal of establishing a totalitarian system", claiming it had made "violations of the Constitution . . . a permanent system of conduct." Essentially, most of the accusations were about the government disregarding the separation of powers, and arrogating legislative and judicial prerogatives to the executive branch of government. President Allende's efforts to re-organize the military and the police forces were characterised as "notorious attempts to use the armed and police forces for partisan ends, destroy their institutional hierarchy, and politically infiltrate their ranks".

It can be argued that the resolution called upon the armed forces to overthrow the government if it did not comply, as follows: "To present the President of the Republic, Ministers of State, and members of the Armed and Police Forces with the grave breakdown of the legal and constitutional order ... it is their duty to put an immediate end to all situations herein referred to that breach the Constitution and the laws of the land with the aim of redirecting government activity toward the path of Law."

President Allende's response
Two days later, on 24 August 1973, President Allende responded, characterising the Congress' declaration as "destined to damage the country's prestige abroad and create internal confusion", predicting "It will facilitate the seditious intention of certain sectors". He noted that the declaration had not obtained the two-thirds Senate majority "constitutionally required" to convict the president of abuse of power: essentially, the Congress was "invoking the intervention of the armed forces and of Order against a democratically elected government" and "subordinat[ing] political representation of national sovereignty to the armed institutions, which neither can nor ought to assume either political functions or the representation of the popular will".

Allende argued he had obeyed constitutional means for including military men to the cabinet "at the service of civic peace and national security, defending republican institutions against insurrection and terrorism". In contrast, he said that Congress was promoting a coup d'état or civil war with a declaration "full of affirmations that had already been refuted before-hand" and which, in substance and process (directly handing it to the ministers rather than directly handing it to the President) violated a dozen articles of the Constitution. He further argued that the legislature was usurping the government's executive function.

President Allende wrote: "Chilean democracy is a conquest by all of the people. It is neither the work nor the gift of the exploiting classes, and it will be defended by those who, with sacrifices accumulated over generations, have imposed it . . . With a tranquil conscience . . . I sustain that never before has Chile had a more democratic government than that over which I have the honor to preside . . . I solemnly reiterate my decision to develop democracy and a state of law to their ultimate consequences . . . Parliament has made itself a bastion against the transformations . . . and has done everything it can to perturb the functioning of the finances and of the institutions, sterilizing all creative initiatives".

Adding that economic and political means would be needed to relieve the country's current crisis, and that the Congress was obstructing said means—having already "paralyzed" the State—they sought to "destroy" it. He concluded by calling upon "the workers, all democrats and patriots" to join him in defending the Chilean Constitution and the "revolutionary process".

Foreign involvement

United States

Many people in different parts of the world immediately suspected the U.S. of foul play. In early newspaper reports, the U.S. denied any involvement or previous knowledge of the coup. Prompted by an incriminating New York Times article, the U.S. Senate opened an investigation into U.S. interference in Chile. A report prepared by the United States Intelligence Community in 2000, at the direction of the National Intelligence Council, that echoed the Church committee, states that  The report stated that the CIA "actively supported the military Junta after the overthrow of Allende but did not assist Pinochet to assume the Presidency." After a review of recordings of telephone conversations between Nixon and Henry Kissinger, Robert Dallek concluded that both of them used the CIA to actively destabilize the Allende government. In one particular conversation about the news of Allende's overthrow, Kissinger complained about the lack of recognition of the American role in the overthrow of a "communist" government, upon which Nixon remarked, "Well, we didn't – as you know – our hand doesn't show on this one." A later CIA report contended that US agents maintained close ties with the Chilean military to collect intelligence but no effort was made to assist them and "under no circumstances attempted to influence them."

Historian Peter Winn found "extensive evidence" of United States complicity in the coup. He states that its covert support was crucial to engineering the coup, as well as for the consolidation of power by the Pinochet regime following the takeover. Winn documents an extensive CIA operation to fabricate reports of a coup against Allende, as justification for the imposition of military rule. Peter Kornbluh asserts that the CIA destabilized Chile and helped create the conditions for the coup, citing documents declassified by the Clinton administration. Other authors point to the involvement of the Defense Intelligence Agency, agents of which allegedly secured the missiles used to bombard the La Moneda Palace.  

The U.S. Government's hostility to the election of Allende in 1970 in Chile was substantiated in documents declassified during the Clinton administration, which show that CIA covert operatives were inserted in Chile in order to prevent a Marxist government from arising and for the purpose of spreading anti-Allende propaganda. As described in the Church Committee report, the CIA was involved in multiple plots designed to remove Allende and then let the Chileans vote in a new election where he would not be a candidate. The first, non-military, approach involved attempting a constitutional coup. This was known as the Track I approach, in which the CIA, with the approval of the 40 Committee, attempted to bribe the Chilean legislature, tried to influence public opinion against Allende, and provided funding to strikes designed to coerce him into resigning. It also attempted to get congress to confirm Jorge Alessandri as the winner of the presidential election. Alessandri, who was an accessory to the conspiracy, was ready to then resign and call for fresh elections. This approach completely failed in 1970 and was not attempted again.

The other approach of the CIA in 1970 (but not later), also known as the Track II approach, was an attempt to encourage a military coup by creating a climate of crisis across the country. A CIA telegram sent to the Chile station on October 16, 1970, stated: 

False flag operatives contacted senior Chilean military officers and informed them that the U.S. would actively support a coup, but would revoke all military aid if such a coup did not happen. In addition, the CIA gave extensive support for black propaganda against Allende, channeled mostly through El Mercurio. Financial assistance was also given to Allende's political opponents, and for organizing strikes and unrest to destabilize the government. By 1970, the U.S. manufacturing company ITT Corporation owned 70% of Chitelco (the Chilean Telephone Company), and also funded El Mercurio. The CIA used ITT as a means of disguising the source of the illegitimate funding Allende's opponents received. On 28 September 1973, unknown bombers bombed ITT's headquarters in New York City, supposedly in retaliation.

According to an article written by lifelong CIA operative Jack Devine, although it was widely reported that the CIA was directly involved in orchestrating and carrying out the coup, subsequently released sources suggest a much reduced role of the US government.

United Kingdom
In September 2020, Declassified UK revealed that the UK government had interfered in Chile's democracy as well:

Under the Labour government of Harold Wilson (1964–1970), a secret Foreign Office unit initiated a propaganda offensive in Chile aiming to prevent Allende, Chile's leading socialist figure, winning power in two presidential elections, in 1964 and 1970.

The unit – the Information Research Department (IRD) – gathered information designed to damage Allende and lend legitimacy to his political opponents, and distributed material to influential figures within Chilean society.

The IRD also shared intelligence about left-wing activity in the country with the US government. British officials in Santiago assisted a CIA-funded media organisation which was part of extensive US covert action to overthrow Allende, culminating in the 1973 coup.

Australia
An Australian Secret Intelligence Service (ASIS) station was established in Chile at the Australian embassy in July 1971 at the request of the CIA and authorised by then Liberal Party Foreign Minister William McMahon. Newly elected Labor Prime Minister Gough Whitlam was informed of the operation in February 1973 and signed a document ordering the closure of the operation several weeks later. It appears, however, the last ASIS agent did not leave Chile until October 1973, one month after the coup d'état had brought down the Allende Government. There were also two officers of Australian Security Intelligence Organisation (ASIO), Australia's internal security service, who were based in Santiago working as migration officers during this period. The failure of timely closure of Australia's covert operations was one of the reasons for the sacking of the Director of ASIS on 21 October 1975. This took effect on 7 November, just four days before Prime Minister's Whitlam's own dismissal in the 1975 Australian constitutional crisis with allegations of CIA political interference.

In June 2021, Clinton Fernandes, a former intelligence analyst, announced that he was trying to confirm the rumours of Australia's involvement in the coup by fighting for the declassification of key documents. On 10 September 2021, the day before the 48th anniversary of the coup, declassified documents confirmed that McMahon did indeed approve the CIA's request to conduct covert operations in Chile.

Military action

By 7:00 am on 11 September 1973, a date chosen to match a historical 1924 coup, the Navy captured Valparaíso, strategically stationing ships and marine infantry in the central coast and closed radio and television networks. The Province Prefect informed President Allende of the Navy's actions; immediately, the president went to the presidential palace with his bodyguards, the "Group of Personal Friends" (GAP). By 8:00 am, the Army had closed most radio and television stations in Santiago city; the Air Force bombed the remaining active stations; the President received incomplete information, and was convinced that only a sector of the Navy conspired against him and his government.

President Allende and Defense Minister Orlando Letelier were unable to communicate with military leaders. Admiral Montero, the Navy's commander and an Allende loyalist, was rendered incommunicado; his telephone service was cut and his cars were sabotaged before the coup d'état, to ensure he could not thwart the opposition. Leadership of the Navy was transferred to José Toribio Merino, planner of the coup d'état and executive officer to Adm. Montero. Augusto Pinochet, General of the Army, and Gustavo Leigh, General of the Air Force, did not answer Allende's telephone calls to them. The General Director of the Carabineros (uniformed police), José María Sepúlveda, and the head of the Investigations Police (plain clothes detectives), Alfredo Joignant answered Allende's calls and immediately went to the La Moneda presidential palace. When Defense Minister Letelier arrived at the Ministry of Defense, controlled by Adm. Patricio Carvajal, he was arrested as the first prisoner of the coup d'état.

Despite evidence that all branches of the Chilean armed forces were involved in the coup, Allende hoped that some units remained loyal to the government. Allende was convinced of Pinochet's loyalty, telling a reporter that the coup d'état leaders must have imprisoned the general. Only at 8:30 am, when the armed forces declared their control of Chile and that Allende was deposed, did the president grasp the magnitude of the military's rebellion. Despite the lack of any military support, Allende refused to resign his office.

At approx. 9:00 the carabineros of the La Moneda left the building.
By 9:00 am, the armed forces controlled Chile, except for the city centre of the capital, Santiago. Allende refused to surrender, despite the military's declaring they would bomb the La Moneda presidential palace if he resisted being deposed. The Socialist Party along with his Cuban advisors proposed to Allende that he escape to the San Joaquín industrial zone in southern Santiago, to later re-group and lead a counter-coup d'état; the president rejected the proposition.  According to Tanya Harmer, Allende's refusal to lead an insurgency against the coup is evidence of his unrelenting desire to bring about change through non-violent methods. The military attempted negotiations with Allende, but the President refused to resign, citing his constitutional duty to remain in office. Finally, Allende gave a farewell speech, telling the nation of the coup d'état and his refusal to resign his elected office under threat.

Leigh ordered the presidential palace bombed, but was told the Air Force's Hawker Hunter jet aircraft would take forty minutes to arrive. Pinochet ordered an armoured and infantry force under General Sergio Arellano to advance upon the La Moneda presidential palace. When the troops moved forward, they were forced to retreat after coming under fire from GAP snipers perched on rooftops. General Arellano called for helicopter gunship support from the commander of the Chilean Army Puma helicopter squadron and the troops were able to advance again. Chilean Air Force aircraft soon arrived to provide close air support for the assault (by bombing the Palace), but the defenders did not surrender until nearly 2:30 pm. First reports said the 65-year-old president had died fighting troops, but later police sources reported he had committed suicide.

Casualties

In the first months after the coup d'état, the military killed thousands of Chilean leftists, both real and suspected, or forced their "disappearance". The military imprisoned 40,000 political enemies in the National Stadium of Chile; among the tortured and killed desaparecidos (disappeared) were the U.S. citizens Charles Horman and Frank Teruggi. In October 1973, the Chilean songwriter Víctor Jara was murdered, along with 70 other people in a series of killings perpetrated by the death squad Caravan of Death (Caravana de la Muerte).

The government arrested some 130,000 people in a three-year period; the dead and disappeared numbered thousands in the first months of the military government. Those include the British physician Sheila Cassidy, who survived to publicize in the UK the human rights violations in Chile. Among those detained was Alberto Bachelet (father of future Chilean President Michelle Bachelet), an Air Force official; he was tortured and died on 12 March 1974, the right-wing newspaper, El Mercurio, reported that Mr Bachelet died after a basketball game, citing his poor cardiac health. Michelle Bachelet and her mother were imprisoned and tortured in the Villa Grimaldi detention and torture centre on 10 January 1975.

After Gen. Pinochet lost the election in the 1988 plebiscite, the Rettig Commission, a multi-partisan truth commission, in 1991 reported the location of torture and detention centers, among others, Colonia Dignidad, the tall ship Esmeralda and Víctor Jara Stadium. Later, in November 2004, the Valech Report confirmed the number as fewer than 3,000 killed, and reduced the number of cases of forced disappearance; but some 28,000 people were arrested, imprisoned, and tortured.
Sixty individuals died as a direct result of fighting on 11 September, although the MIR and GAP continued to fight the following day. In all, 46 of Allende's guard (the GAP, Grupo de Amigos Personales) were killed, some of them in combat with the soldiers that took the Moneda. Allende's Cuban-trained guard would have had about 300 elite commando-trained GAP fighters at the time of the coup, but the use of brute military force, especially the use of Hawker Hunters, may have handicapped many GAP fighters from further action.

According to official reports prepared after the return of democracy, at La Moneda only two people died: President Allende and the journalist Augusto Olivares (both by suicide). Two more were injured, Antonio Aguirre and Osvaldo Ramos, both members of President Allende's entourage; they would later be allegedly kidnapped from the hospital and disappeared. In November 2006, the Associated Press noted that more than 15 bodyguards and aides were taken from the palace during the coup and are still unaccounted for; in 2006 Augusto Pinochet was indicted for two of their deaths.

On the military side, there were 34 deaths: two army sergeants, three army corporals, four army privates, 2 navy lieutenants, 1 navy corporal, 4 naval cadets, 3 navy conscripts and 15 carabineros. In mid-September, the Chilean military junta claimed its troops suffered another 16 dead and 100 injured by gunfire in mopping-up operations against Allende supporters, and Pinochet said: "sadly there are still some armed groups who insist on attacking, which means that the military rules of wartime apply to them." A press photographer also died in the crossfire while attempting to cover the event. On 23 October 1973, 23-year-old army corporal Benjamín Alfredo Jaramillo Ruz, who was serving with the Cazadores, became the first fatal casualty of the counterinsurgency operations in the mountainous area of Alquihue in Valdivia after being shot by a sniper. The Chilean Army suffered 12 killed in various clashes with MIR guerrillas and GAP fighters in October 1973.

While fatalities in the battle during the coup might have been relatively small, the Chilean security forces sustained 162 dead in the three following months as a result of continued resistance, and tens of thousands of people were arrested during the coup and held in the National Stadium. This was because the plans for the coup called for the arrest of every man, woman and child on the streets the morning of 11 September. Of these approximately 40,000 to 50,000 perfunctory arrests, several hundred individuals would later be detained, questioned, tortured, and in some cases murdered. While these deaths did not occur before the surrender of Allende's forces, they occurred as a direct result of arrests and round-ups during the coup's military action.

Allende's death

President Allende died in La Moneda during the coup. The junta officially declared that he committed suicide with a rifle given to him by Fidel Castro, two doctors from the infirmary of La Moneda stated that they witnessed the suicide, and an autopsy labelled Allende's death a suicide. Vice Admiral Patricio Carvajal, one of the primary instigators of the coup, claimed that "Allende committed suicide and is dead now."  Patricio Guijon, one of the president's doctors, had testified to witnessing Allende shoot himself under the chin with the rifle while seated on a sofa.

At the time, few of Allende's supporters believed the explanation that Allende had killed himself. Allende's body was exhumed in May 2011. The exhumation was requested by members of the Allende family, including his daughter Isabel who viewed the question of her father's death as "an insult to scientific intelligence." A scientific autopsy was performed and the autopsy team delivered a unanimous finding on 19 July 2011 that Allende committed suicide using an AK-47 rifle. The team was composed of international forensic experts to assure an independent evaluation.

However, on 31 May 2011, Chile's state television station reported that a top-secret military account of Allende's death had been discovered in the home of a former military justice official. The 300-page document was found only when the house was destroyed in the 2010 Chilean earthquake. After reviewing the report, two forensic experts told Televisión Nacional de Chile "that they are inclined to conclude that Allende was assassinated." Two forensics experts said they believed he was shot with a small-calibre weapon prior to the AK-47. One expert, Luis Ravanal, noted the lack of blood on his collar, sweater and throat suggested someone else fired the AK-47 when he was already dead.

Allende's widow and family escaped the military government and were accepted for exile in Mexico, where they remained for 17 years.

Aftermath

Installing a new regime

On 13 September, the Junta dissolved Congress, outlawed the parties that had been part of the Popular Unity coalition, and all political activity was declared "in recess". The military government took control of all media, including the radio broadcasting that Allende attempted to use to give his final speech to the nation. It is not known how many Chileans actually heard the last words of Allende as he spoke them, but a transcript and audio of the speech survived the military government. Chilean scholar Lidia M. Baltra details how the military took control of the media platforms and turned them into their own "propaganda machine." The only two newspapers that were allowed to continue publishing after the military takeover were El Mercurio and La Tercera de la Hora, both of which were anti-Allende under his leadership. The dictatorship's silencing of the leftist point of view extended past the media and into "every discourse that expressed any resistance to the regime." An example of this is the torturing and death of folk singer Victor Jara. The military government detained Jara in the days following the coup. He, along with many other leftists, was held in Estadio Nacional, or the National Stadium of Chile in the capital of Santiago. Initially, the Junta tried to 
silence him by crushing his hands, but ultimately he was murdered. Immediately after the coup the military sought television host Don Francisco to have him report on the events. Don Francisco declined the offer, encouraging the captain that had approached him to take the role of reporter himself.

Initially, there were four leaders of the junta: In addition to General Augusto Pinochet, from the Army, there were General Gustavo Leigh Guzmán, of the Air Force; Admiral José Toribio Merino Castro, of the Navy (who replaced Constitutionalist Admiral Raúl Montero); and General Director César Mendoza Durán, of the National Police (Carabineros de Chile) (who replaced Constitutionalist General Director José María Sepúlveda). Coup leaders soon decided against a rotating presidency and named General Pinochet permanent head of the junta.

In the months that followed the coup, the junta, with authoring work by historian Gonzalo Vial and Admiral Patricio Carvajal, published a book titled El Libro Blanco del cambio de gobierno en Chile (commonly known as El Libro Blanco, "The White Book of the Change of Government in Chile"), where they attempted to justify the coup by claiming that they were in fact anticipating a self-coup (the alleged Plan Zeta, or Plan Z) that Allende's government or its associates were purportedly preparing. Historian Peter Winn states that the Central Intelligence Agency had an extensive part to play in fabricating the conspiracy and in selling it to the press, both in Chile and internationally. Although later discredited and officially recognized as the product of political propaganda, Gonzalo Vial has pointed to the similarities between the alleged Plan Z and other existing paramilitary plans of the Popular Unity parties in support of its legitimacy.

A document from September 13 shows that Jaime Guzmán was by then already tasked to study the creation of a new constitution. One of the first measures of the dictatorship was to set up a Secretaría Nacional de la Juventud (SNJ, National Youth Office). This was done on 28 October 1973, even before the Declaration of Principles of the junta made in March 1974. This was a way of mobilizing sympathetic elements of the civil society in support for the dictatorship.

Continued violence

The newspaper La Tercera published on its front page a photograph showing prisoners at the Quiriquina Island Camp who had been captured during the fighting in Concepción. The photograph's caption stated that some of the detained were local leaders of the "Unidad Popular" while others were "extremists who had attacked the armed forces with firearms". The photo is reproduced in Docuscanner. This is consistent with reports in newspapers and broadcasts in Concepción about the activities of the Armed Forces, which mentioned clashes with "extremists" on several occasions from 11 to 14 September. Nocturnal skirmishes took place around the Hotel Alonso de Ercilla in Colo Colo and San Martín Street, one block away from the Army and military police administrative headquarters. A recently published testimony about the clashes in Concepcion offers several plausible explanations for the reticence of witnesses to these actions.

Besides political leaders and participants, the coup also affected many everyday Chilean citizens.  Thousands were killed, went missing, and were injured.  Because of the political instability in their country, many relocated elsewhere.  Canada, among other countries, became a main point of refuge for many Chilean citizens.  Through an operation known as "Special Movement Chile", more than 7,000 Chileans were relocated to Canada in the months following 11 September 1973. These refugees are now known as Chilean Canadian people and have a population of over 38,000.

The U.S. view of the coup continues to spark controversy. Beginning in late 2014 in response to a request by then Senate Armed Services Committee Chair Carl Levin, United States Southern Command (USSOUTHCOM) William J. Perry Center for Hemispheric Defense Studies (CHDS), located at the National Defense University in Washington, D.C., has been under investigation by the Department of Defense Office of Inspector General. Insider national security whistleblower complaints included that the Center knowingly protected a CHDS professor from Chile who was a former top advisor to Pinochet after belonging to the Dirección de Inteligencia Nacional / DINA state terrorist organization (whose attack against a former Chilean foreign minister in 1976 in Washington, D.C. resulted in two deaths, including that of an American). "Reports that NDU hired foreign military officers with histories of involvement in human rights abuses, including torture and extrajudicial killings of civilians, are stunning, and they are repulsive", said Sen. Patrick Leahy, D-Vermont, the author of the "Leahy Law" prohibiting U.S. assistance to military units and members of foreign security forces that violate human rights.

Roberto Thieme, the military leader of Fatherland and Liberty, who was imprisoned on 11 September was shocked to hear about the degree of violence the coup was carried out with. Despite being an arduous opponent of Unidad Popular he had expected a cleaner coup.

International reaction
President of Argentina Juan Domingo Perón condemned the coup calling it a "fatality for the continent". Before the coup Perón had warned the more radical of his followers to stay calm and "not do as Allende". Argentine students protested the coup at the Chilean embassy in Buenos Aires, where part of them chanted that they were "ready to cross the Andes" (dispuestos a cruzar la cordillera).

Legal impact
A number of cargo shipments involving trade with Cuba were affected by government policy decisions, and subsequently performance of the trade contracts underlying the shipping deliveries was made illegal under Cuban law. The Chilean company Iansa had purchased sugar from the Cuban business entity, Cubazukar, and several shipments were at different stages of the shipping and delivery process. The ships involved included:
Playa Larga (delivery in Chile was underway but was not completed before the ship left)
The Marble Island (the ship was en route for Chile but was diverted elsewhere)
Aegis Farne (hire was cancelled before the cargo had been loaded).

The shipping contracts used c.i.f. trade terms. Iansa sued Cubazukar for non-delivery. The High Court (in England) ruled that IANSA was entitled to damages in respect of the undelivered balance of the Playa Larga cargo and to restitution of the price paid for the Marble Island cargo. Subsequent appeals by both parties were dismissed. In regard to the Aegis Farne shipping, the contract was frustrated and therefore Cubazukar were not in breach.

Commemoration
The commemoration of the coup is associated to competing narratives on its cause and effects. The coup has been commemorated by detractors and supporters in various ways.

On 11 September 1975 Pinochet lit the Llama de la Libertad (lit. Flame of Liberty) to commemorate the coup. This flame was extinguished in 2004. Avenida Nueva Providencia in Providencia, Santiago, was renamed Avenida 11 de Septiembre in 1980. In the 30th anniversary of the coup President Ricardo Lagos inaugurated the Morandé 80 entrance to La Moneda. This entrance to the presidential palace had been erased during the repairs the dictatorship did to the building after the bombing.

40th anniversary
The 40th anniversary of the coup in 2013 was particularly intense. That year the name of Avenida 11 de Septiembre was reversed to the original Avenida Nueva Providencia. The Association of Chilean Magistrates issued a public statement in early September 2013 recognizing the past unwillingness of judges to protect those persecuted by dictatorship. On 11 September 2013 hundreds of Chileans posed as dead in the streets of Santiago in remembrance of the ones "disappeared" by the dictatorship.

The centre-left opposition refused to attend the commemoration event organized by Sebastián Piñera's right-wing government organizing instead a separate event. Osvaldo Andrade of the Socialist Party explained that attendance was not viable as Piñera's government was "packed with passive accomplices" of the dictatorship. Some right-wing politicians also declined the invitation. Presidential candidate Michelle Bachelet planned to spend the day visiting Museum of Memory and Human Rights. President Piñera held an unusual speech in which he denounced "passive accomplices" like news reporters who deliberately changed or omitted the truth and judges who rejected recursos de amparos that could have saved lives. People who knew things or could have known things but decided to stay quiet were also criticized as passive accomplices in Piñera's speech.

A number of new films, theatre plays, and photography expositions were held to cast light on the abuses and censorship of the dictatorship. The number of new books published on the subject in 2013 was such that it constituted an editorial boom. The Museum of Memory and Human Rights also displayed a collection of declassified CIA, FBI, Defense Department, and White House records illustrating the U.S. role in the dictatorship and the coup. Conferences and seminaries on the subject of coup were also held. Various series and interviews with politicians on the subject of the coup and the dictatorship were aired on Chilean TV in 2013.

See also
1970 Chilean presidential election
Allende en su laberinto
Bear Story
Bestia
Chicago Boys
Colonia
Cuban packages – arms smuggling from Cuba
Ecos del Desierto
Government Junta of Chile (1924)
Government Junta of Chile (1973)
Invisible Heroes
Machuca
Marjorie Agosín
Missing (1982 film)
¡Nae pasaran!
Operation Condor
Operation TOUCAN (KGB) – secret KGB operations in Chile
Patio 29
Project FUBELT – secret CIA operations to unseat Allende.
ReMastered: Massacre at the Stadium
René Schneider
Rettig Report
The Battle of Chile
The Black Pimpernel
The House of the Spirits
United States intervention in Chile
Valech Report
United States involvement in regime change
United States involvement in regime change in Latin America

Notes

References
John R. Bawden (2016). The Pinochet Generation: The Chilean Military in the Twentieth Century. Tuscaloosa: University of Alabama Press.
Simon Collier & William F. Sater (1996). A History of Chile: 1808–1994. Cambridge: Cambridge University Press.
Julio Faundez (1988). Marxism and democracy in Chile: From 1932 to the fall of Allende, New Haven: Yale University Press.
Ignacio González Camus, ed. (1988). El día en que murió Allende (The day that Allende Died), Chilean Institute of Humanistic Studies (ICHEH) / CESOC.

Anke Hoogvelt (1997). Globalisation and the postcolonial world, London: Macmillan.
Thomas Karamessines (1970). Operating guidance cable on coup plotting in Chile, Washington: National Security Council.
Jeane Kirkpatrick (1979). "Dictatorships and Double Standards", Commentary, November, pp 34–45.
Henry Kissinger (1970). National Security Decision 93: Policy Towards Chile, Washington: National Security Council.
Richard Norton-Taylor (1999). "Truth will out: Unearthing the declassified documents in America which give the lie to Lady Thatcher's outburst", The Guardian, 8 July 1999, London.
Alec Nove (1986). Socialism, Economics and Development, London: Allen & Unwin.
James F. Petras & Morris H. Morley (1974). How Allende fell: A study in U.S.–Chilean relations, Nottingham: Spokesman Books.
Sigmund, P.E. (1986). "Development Strategies in Chile, 1964–1983: The Lessons of Failure", Chapter 6 in I.J. Kim (Ed.), Development and Cultural Change: Cross-Cultural Perspectives, New York: Paragon House Publishers, pp. 159–178.
Valenzuela, J.S., & Valenzuela, A. (1993). "Modernisation and Dependency: Alternative Perspectives in the Study of Latin-American Underdervelopment", in M.A. Seligson & J.T. Pass-Smith (Eds.), Development and Underdevelopment: The Political Economy of Inequality, Boulder: Lynnes Rienner, pp. 203–216.

External links

Cronología, Salvador-Allende.cl, originally published in Archivo Salvador Allende, number 14. An extensive Spanish-language site providing a day-by-day chronology of the Allende era. This is clearly a partisan, pro-Allende source, but the research and detail are enormous. 
National Security Archive's Chile Documentation Project which provides documents obtained from FOIA requests regarding U.S. involvement in Chile, beginning with attempts to promote a coup in 1970 and continuing through U.S. support for Pinochet
US Dept. of State FOIA Church Report (Covert Action in Chile)
11 September 1973, When US-Backed Pinochet Forces Took Power in Chile – video report by Democracy Now!
The Coup in Chile. Jacobin. 11 September 2015.

Chilean Coup D'etat
Coup d'etat
Central Intelligence Agency operations
Presidency of Salvador Allende
Military dictatorship of Chile (1973–1990)
Chile–United States relations
Cold War conflicts
Last stands
Chilean Coup D'etat
Dirty wars
Military coups in Chile
Cold War in Latin America
False flag operations
Henry Kissinger
September 1973 events in South America
1970s in Santiago, Chile
United States involvement in regime change